Al-Sindiyana is a Syrian village located in Wadi al-Uyun Nahiyah in Masyaf District, Hama.  According to the Syria Central Bureau of Statistics (CBS), al-Sindiyana had a population of 621 in the 2004 census.

References 

Populated places in Masyaf District